Paralissoeme maculipennis is a species of beetle in the family Cerambycidae, the only species in the genus Paralissoeme.

References

Ectenessini